Nathan Clement Kabasele Mwamba, commonly known as Nathan Kabasele, (born 14 January 1994) is a Belgian professional footballer who is currently free agent and plays as a striker.

International career
Kabasele was born in Belgium and is of Congolese descent. He is a youth international footballer for Belgium.

References

External links 
 Voetbal International profile 
 
 

1994 births
Living people
Association football forwards
Belgian footballers
Belgian sportspeople of Democratic Republic of the Congo descent
Belgian Pro League players
Liga I players
Torino F.C. players
K.V.C. Westerlo players
R.S.C. Anderlecht players
De Graafschap players
Gaziantep F.K. footballers
Royale Union Saint-Gilloise players
FC Voluntari players
Al-Diwaniya FC players
Belgian expatriate footballers
Expatriate footballers in Turkey
Expatriate footballers in Italy
Expatriate footballers in the Netherlands
Expatriate footballers in Romania
Expatriate footballers in Iraq
Place of birth missing (living people)
Belgium under-21 international footballers
Belgium youth international footballers